Zhou Yuanguo (born 28 December 1977) is a Chinese windsurfer who competed in the 2000 Summer Olympics and in the 2004 Summer Olympics.

References

External links
 
 
 

1977 births
Living people
Chinese windsurfers
Chinese male sailors (sport)
Olympic sailors of China
Sailors at the 2000 Summer Olympics – Mistral One Design
Sailors at the 2004 Summer Olympics – Mistral One Design
Asian Games gold medalists for China
Asian Games medalists in sailing
Sailors at the 1998 Asian Games
Sailors at the 2002 Asian Games
Medalists at the 1998 Asian Games
Medalists at the 2002 Asian Games
Sportspeople from Liaoning
People from Fushun
20th-century Chinese people
21st-century Chinese people